Great Brynhill is a small hamlet and farm in the Vale of Glamorgan in south Wales. It consists little more than a few farms including the Little Brynhill Farm and Thorn Falcon Farm (Little Brynhill) and the Great Brynhill Farm. It is located in the historical parish of Merthyr Dyfan and near Colcot now northern districts of the town of Barry. It is accessed via a lane from Port Road (the A4050 road) but can also be accessed from Dyffryn along the lane to the New Wallace Farm and Goldsland which lie just to the northeast. 

"Bryn" means "hill" in Welsh, so the name literally means "Great hill hill". The Little Brynhill Farm is owned by the Tanner family who are notable milk suppliers in Barry under the company name "W. A. Tanner & Son". One of the farms sold off some of their land along with neighbouring Highlight Farm when Brynhill Golf Club was formed in 1921. According to the Barry & District News, Thorn Falcon Farm sold for £400,000 on 25 November 2005.

References

Neighbourhoods of Barry, Vale of Glamorgan
Villages in the Vale of Glamorgan
Farms in the Vale of Glamorgan